In Time: The Best of R.E.M. 1988–2003 is the second official compilation album released by R.E.M. Issued in 2003, it includes tracks from their Warner Bros. Records era, from 1988's Green to 2001's Reveal, as well as two new recordings and two songs from movie soundtracks. The album was the tenth-best-selling album of 2003 in the UK, and the 50th-best-selling album of the 2000s in the UK.

Background
"Bad Day" was a demo version in 1986, a Life's Rich Pageant outtake when Bill Berry was still in the band, and was re-recorded for this compilation. "Animal" was a recent song written for their upcoming studio album. Similarly, "All the Right Friends", originally written in the early 1980s, had been re-recorded by the band for use in Cameron Crowe's 2001 film Vanilla Sky. Finally, "The Great Beyond" was initially issued in 1999 as part of Miloš Forman's film on Andy Kaufman, Man on the Moon. It ended up becoming the band's biggest UK hit, with a No. 3 peak, in early 2000. This, the third inclusion of the song on an official release, is the only unedited version. On the Man on the Moon soundtrack, there is some dialogue from the movie at the end of the track; the single version is a radio edit, with the bridge omitted.

In Time: The Best of R.E.M. 1988–2003 was also issued in a limited two-disc edition that included a "Rarities and B-Sides" disc from the same era, with liner notes by Peter Buck. The single-disc edition of the album reached No. 1 in the UK, while going platinum in the U.S. and peaking at #8. The limited-edition two-disc release managed to reach No. 16 in the U.S. and No. 37 in the UK. There is also a vinyl edition which consists of two LPs inside a gatefold cover and a limited CD box-set edition featuring all eighteen tracks on their own individual one-track CDs, with cover art from the original singles.

A notable omission from the album is the song "Shiny Happy People" which was deliberately left out by the band despite it being one of their biggest hits.

A companion DVD, entitled In View: The Best of R.E.M. 1988–2003, was released at the same time. In 2005, Warner Bros. Records issued an expanded two-disc edition of the compilation which included a CD, a DVD-Audio disc containing a 5.1-channel surround sound mix of the album done by Elliot Scheiner, and the original CD booklet with expanded liner notes. The "Rarities and B-Sides" bonus disc from the limited edition is not included in this package.

Track listing
All songs written by Bill Berry, Peter Buck, Mike Mills and Michael Stipe except as indicated.
"Man on the Moon" (from Automatic for the People, 1992) – 5:12
"The Great Beyond" (Buck, Mills, Stipe) (from the Man on the Moon soundtrack, 1999) – 5:04
"Bad Day" (previously unreleased) – 4:05
"What's the Frequency, Kenneth?" (from Monster, 1994) – 3:58
"All the Way to Reno (You're Gonna Be a Star)" (Buck, Mills, Stipe) (from Reveal, 2001) – 4:43
"Losing My Religion" (from Out of Time, 1991) – 4:26
"E-Bow the Letter" (from New Adventures in Hi-Fi, 1996) – 5:22
"Orange Crush" (from Green, 1988) – 3:50
"Imitation of Life" (Buck, Mills, Stipe) (from Reveal, 2001) – 3:56
"Daysleeper" (Buck, Mills, Stipe) (from Up, 1998) – 3:37
"Animal" (Buck, Mills, Stipe) (previously unreleased) – 4:00
"The Sidewinder Sleeps Tonite" (from Automatic for the People, 1992) – 4:06
"Stand" (from Green, 1988) – 3:09
"Electrolite" (from New Adventures in Hi-Fi, 1996) – 4:04
"All the Right Friends" (from the Vanilla Sky soundtrack, 2001) – 2:45
"Everybody Hurts" (from Automatic for the People, 1992) – 5:17
"At My Most Beautiful" (Buck, Mills, Stipe) (from Up, 1998) – 3:33
"Nightswimming" (from Automatic for the People, 1992) – 4:16

Bonus disc 'Rarities and B-sides'
"Pop Song 89" (acoustic) – 2:56
 B-side of "Pop Song 89" 7 Inch; 1989
"Turn You Inside-Out" (live) – 4:16
 although listed on the cover as being from the live video Tourfilm (which version was also released as B-side of "Losing My Religion" "Collector's Editions" CD 1), this recording is actually from the radio broadcast of the Orlando show from April 30, 1989, previously included on a "Get Up" promotional CD-single.
"Fretless" – 4:49
 B-side of "Losing My Religion" "Collector's Editions" CD 2, Until the End of the World soundtrack, B-side of "The Sidewinder Sleeps Tonite" "Collector's Edition" CD 1 UK; 1991
"Chance (Dub)" – 2:33
 B-side of "Everybody Hurts" "Collector's Edition" CD 2 UK; 1993
"It's a Free World, Baby" – 5:11
 B-side of "Drive" "Collector's Edition" Single UK & the Coneheads soundtrack; 1992
"Drive" (live, November 19, 1992) – 3:59
Alternative NRG, B-side of "Strange Currencies" CD single; 1994
"Star Me Kitten" (featuring William S. Burroughs) – 3:29
Songs in the Key of X: Music from and Inspired by the X-Files; 1996
"Revolution" – 3:02
 Batman & Robin soundtrack; 1997
"Leave" (alternate version) – 4:40
 A Life Less Ordinary soundtrack; 1997
"Why Not Smile" (Oxford American version) (Buck, Mills, Stipe) – 2:59
 B-side of "Daysleeper" CD single; 1998
"The Lifting" (original version) (Buck, Mills, Stipe) – 5:19
 B-side of "Imitation of Life" CD single; 2001
"Beat a Drum" (Dalkey demo) (Buck, Mills, Stipe) – 4:25
 B-side of "Imitation of Life" CD single; 2001
"2JN" (Buck, Mills, Stipe) – 3:24
 B-side of "Imitation of Life" CD single; 2001
"The One I Love" (live from the Museum of Television and Radio, June 8, 2001) – 3:23
 previously unreleased
"Country Feedback" (live from Wiesbaden, Germany, 2003) – 6:15
 previously unreleased

Later pressings of the collector's edition have the second disc enhanced with the "Bad Day" video.

Charts

Weekly charts

Year-end charts

Decade-end charts

Certifications and sales

References

External links

Albums produced by Scott Litt
B-side compilation albums
Albums produced by Bill Berry
Albums produced by Mike Mills
Albums produced by Peter Buck
Albums produced by Michael Stipe
R.E.M. compilation albums
2003 greatest hits albums
Warner Records compilation albums
Albums produced by Pat McCarthy (record producer)